Namcha Barwa or Namchabarwa (Chinese: 南迦巴瓦峰, Pinyin: Nánjiābāwǎ Fēng) is a mountain peak lying in Tibet in the region of Pemako. It lies in the Nyingchi Prefecture of Tibet. It is the highest peak in the 180 km long Namcha Barwa Himal range (also called the Namjagbarwa syntaxis or Namjagbarwa Group Complex), which is considered the easternmost syntaxis/section of the Himalaya in southeastern Tibet and northeastern India where the Himalaya are said to end, although high ranges (Hengduan Mountains on China–Myanmar border) actually continue another 300 km east.

Location
Namcha Barwa is in an isolated part of southeastern Tibet rarely visited by outsiders. It stands inside the Great Bend of the Yarlung Tsangpo River as the river enters its notable gorge across the Himalaya, emerging as the Siang and becoming the Brahmaputra. Namcha Barwa's sister peak Gyala Peri at  rises across the gorge  to the north-north-west (NNW).

Notable features
After  Batura Sar in the Karakoram was climbed in 1976, Namcha Barwa became the highest unclimbed independent mountain in the world,
until it was finally climbed in 1992.

In addition to being one of the highest mountains in the world, Namcha Barwa is also the third most prominent peak in the Himalayas after Mount Everest and Nanga Parbat.

Frank Kingdon-Ward described in the 1920s "a quaint prophecy among the 
Kongbo Tibetans that Namche Barwa will one day fall into the Tsangpo gorge and block the river, which will then turn aside and flow over the Doshong La [pass]. This is recorded in a book by some fabulous person whose image may be seen in the little gompa [Buddhist monastery] at Payi, in Pome."(126-7) (See Beyul for the reason behind the prophecy and  Padmasambhava or another Tertön for the "fabulous person whose image may be seen in the little gompa").

Climbing history
Namcha Barwa was located in 1912 by British surveyors but the area remained virtually unvisited until Chinese alpinists began attempting the peak in the 1980s.  Although they scouted multiple routes, they did not reach the summit. In 1990 a Chinese-Japanese expedition reconnoitered the peak.  Another joint expedition reached  in 1991 but lost member Hiroshi Onishi in an avalanche. The next year a third Chinese-Japanese expedition established six camps on the South Ridge over intermediate Nai Peng, reaching the summit on October 30.
Eleven climbers reached the summit.
U.K. Alpine Club's Himalayan Index lists no further ascents.

See also
 Geology of the Himalaya
 Zanskar is a subdistrict of the Kargil district, which lies in the Indian union territory of Ladakh
 Indus River - the erosion at Nanga Parbat is causing rapid uplifting of lower crustal rocks
 Mount Everest
 Sutlej River - similar small-scale erosion to the Indus
 Tibetan Plateau to the North (also discussed in Geography of Tibet)
 Paleotethys
 Karakoram fault system - major active fault system within the Himalayas

References

External links
 Chinese expedition in the 1980s

 Virtual Aerial Tour Video

Mountains of Tibet
Seven-thousanders of the Himalayas